Alphonse Georger (born 25 May 1936 in Sarreguemines, Moselle) is a French and Algerian Catholic bishop and an Emeritus Bishop of the Roman Catholic Diocese of Oran in Algeria since December 2012.

Bibliography
Alphonse Georger was ordained priest Catholic priest on 29 June 1965 in the Roman Catholic Archdiocese of Algiers. He got Algerian nationality in 1977.

Georger was appointed Bishop of the Roman Catholic Diocese of Oran on 10 July 1998 by Pope John Paul II and he was consecrated on 16 August 1998 by Archbishop Joseph Duval, Archbishop of Roman Catholic Archdiocese of Rouen.

Retiring on grounds of age in 2012, his successor, Jean-Paul Vesco was named on 1 December 2012 and was ordained on 25 January 2012. Monsignor Georger then became an emeritus bishop.

Publications

 A seminarian Journal in Algeria, 1960-1962, Cana, 2003.

References

External links
 http://www.catholic-hierarchy.org/bishop/bgeor.html

Living people
1936 births
People from Moselle (department)
People from Oran
21st-century Roman Catholic bishops in Algeria
French emigrants to Algeria
Roman Catholic bishops of Oran